Manman may refer to:

 Manman (software), a family of Enterprise resource planning software
 Manman Brijit, Vodou goddess
 Man Man, a band from Philadelphia, Pennsylvania

See also